The Seaside: Original Edition is an expanded reissue of the 1984 demo album The Seaside by the English rock band Cardiacs. It was released digitally on 11 January 2015 to mark the album's 30th anniversary. It includes a new remaster of the album from the original tapes, featuring all thirteen tracks.

The Seaside: Original Edition was available as a box set offering alternate versions of the album's songs "Gina Lollobrigida", "Hope Day" and "Jibber and Twitch" from 1995 reissues on a download voucher. The box set contains unseen artwork and reproduced band memorabilia. The release was succeeded by the second Sea Nymphs album On the Dry Land (2016) and the rehearsal video Some Fairytales From the Rotten Shed (2017) for the Special Garage Concerts live album.

Background and content 
Since Tim Smith's debilitation from a cardiac arrest in 2008, the band had been inactive, with label representatives providing updates on social media. The first new Cardiacs release since the 2007 single "Ditzy Scene", the 2014 remaster was done using the original album tapes. With additional punch to the bass and kick drum, the sound is a closer approximation of the original cassette than the treble heavier 1995 release.

A download voucher features alternate mixes of three tracks from the 1995 release. The box set includes a photobook featuring promo photography by Robin Fransella as well as a replica of the original cassette release and lyric booklet. Also included are replicas of the Alphabet Business Concern's YOUsletters, photos and flyers from 1984, and four badges. The album was released as a box set on 30 November and was reissued digitally on 6 February 2018 where the release date has manually been set as 11 January 2015.

Reception 
In his review for The Quietus, Sean Kitching praised the mix and packaging. He commented: "it sounds far better than the treble heavy 90s CD versions, which nevertheless doesn't appear to cheer the crestfallen face of Jim Smith now returning to his rightful place on the front cover." Zac of Caught in the Crossfire said that "Hearing "Dinner Time" on the new re-issue today made me bounce off the walls. It was like discovering Cardiacs for the very first time again."

Track listing 
All songs written and arranged by Tim Smith unless otherwise indicated.

References 

2015 compilation albums
Reissue albums
Cardiacs compilation albums